Singles are a type of music release that typically have fewer tracks than an extended play or album; during the 1950s, sales of singles in the United Kingdom were compiled by the magazine New Musical Express (NME), and published weekly as a record chart. The singles chart was founded in 1952 by Percy Dickins of the NME, who wanted to imitate the hit parade that featured in the American magazine Billboard; before this, the popularity of a song had been measured by its sales of sheet music. Dickins sampled twenty shops, asking which their ten biggest-selling singles were. His aggregated list of sales was then published in the NME on 14 November 1952 as a Top 12 chart. The NME's chart is considered by the Official Charts Company (OCC) to be the canonical UK Singles Chart during the 1950s; it was expanded to a Top 20 on 1 October 1954.

Sales of records significantly increased in the mid-fifties, following the birth of rock and roll. As a result, the top ten biggest-selling singles of the 1950s were all released in the latter half of the decade. The biggest-selling single of this period was "Rock Around the Clock" by Bill Haley & His Comets, which became the first single ever to sell more than a million copies in the UK.

Singles

References
General (chart positions)

Specific

1950s
1950s
1950s in British music